"The Safety Dance" is a song by Canadian new wave/synth-pop band Men Without Hats, released in Canada in 1982 as the second single from Rhythm of Youth. The song was written by lead singer Ivan Doroschuk after he had been kicked out of a club for pogo dancing.

The song entered the Canadian top 50 in February 1983, peaking at number 11 on May 14. In the meantime, "The Safety Dance" was released in the US on March 16, but did not enter the US charts for a few months. When it finally did, the record became a bigger hit than it had been in Canada, spending four weeks at its peak position of number 3 in September and October 1983, and staying on the Billboard Hot 100 for 24 weeks. It also reached number 1 on Cash Box, as well as number 1 on the Billboard Dance Chart. "The Safety Dance" found similar success in other parts of the world, entering the UK charts in August and peaking at number 6 in early November, and entering the New Zealand charts in November, eventually peaking at number 2 in early 1984. The song was also a massive success in South Africa, reaching No. 1 on the Springbok charts. The song has been inducted into the Canadian Songwriters Hall of Fame.

In 2021, the band released a recording of a new version the song, reimagined as a mid-tempo ballad, under the title "No Friends of Mine". The track is included on their 2022 EP Again (Part 1).

Meaning of the song
The writer/lead singer Ivan Doroschuk has explained that "The Safety Dance" is a protest against bouncers prohibiting dancers from pogoing to 1980s new wave music in clubs when disco was declining and new wave was coming in. Unlike disco dancing, which is done with partners, new wave dancing is done individually and involves holding the torso rigid while thrashing about; pogoing involves jumping up and down (the more deliberately violent evolution of pogoing is slamdancing). Clubgoers doing the newer pogo dance were perceived as posing a danger to disco dancers on the dance floor, and so club bouncers would tell pogoers to stop or be kicked out of the club. Thus, the song is a protest and a call for freedom of expression.

In 2003, on an episode of VH1's True Spin, Doroschuk responded to two common interpretations of the song. Firstly, he explained "The Safety Dance" is not a call for safe sex, and that this interpretation is "people reading into it a bit too much". Secondly, he explained that it is not an anti-nuclear protest song per se despite the nuclear imagery at the end of the video. Doroschuk stated that "it wasn't a question of just being anti-nuclear, it was a question of being anti-establishment."

Music video
The music video for the song (which uses the shorter single version), directed by Tim Pope, is notable for its British folk revival imagery, featuring Morris dancers, Mummers, Punch and Judy and a maypole. It was filmed in the village of West Kington in Wiltshire, England. Ivan Doroschuk is the only member of the band actually to perform in the video. Doroschuk, and others in the video, can be seen repeatedly forming an "S" sign by jerking both arms into a stiff pose, one arm in an upward curve and the other in a downward curve, apparently referring to the first letter in "safety". The Morris dancers seen in the video were the Chippenham Town Morris Men. The dwarf actor is Mike Edmonds, whose T-shirt in the video shows the Rhythm of Youth album cover. The identity of the blonde-haired woman by the name of Jenny seen dancing in the video remained unknown until 2013 when she was identified as Louise Court, a journalist who was editor-in-chief at Cosmopolitan and became a director at Hearst Magazines UK in 2015.

Chart and certifications

Weekly charts

Year-end charts

Multi-year charts

Certifications

In popular culture
In 1984, "Weird Al" Yankovic released a parody of "The Safety Dance" titled "The Brady Bunch" on his album In 3-D, about The Brady Bunch TV series.

The song is performed in "Dream On", a first-season episode of the TV series Glee. In the episode, wheelchair user Artie Abrams (Kevin McHale) fantasizes about being able to dance and leading a flash mob performance of the song in a shopping mall. Ivan Doroschuk credited this version with "reaching a whole other section of people" to appreciate the song.

Saturday Night Safety Dance is a 1980s-themed program on Sirius XM's 1st Wave channel.

In 2021, Angel Olsen released a cover of the song from her EP of 1980s covers Aisles.

See also
List of Cash Box Top 100 number-one singles of 1983
List of number-one dance singles of 1983 (U.S.)

References

External links

 "Ivan Doroschuk explains meaning behind song" (video) at Veoh

1982 songs
1983 singles
Men Without Hats songs
Music videos directed by Tim Pope
Cashbox number-one singles
Number-one singles in South Africa
Songs about dancing
Novelty and fad dances
Virgin Records singles